Lo Hsing Han or Law Sit Han (ca. 1930s – July 6, 2013) was a Burmese businessman and drug trafficker. He later became a major business tycoon across Burma, with financial ties to Singapore. He was an ethnic Kokang-Chinese. His spouse, Zhang Xiaowen, is a Chinese citizen and native of Gengma County in Yunnan.

Rise and fall
Lo Hsing Han was born poor in Kokang district. He reportedly started his opium-trafficking career as chief of a local militia called Ka Kwe Ye (KKY) set up with the encouragement of General Ne Win to fight the Communists. By the early 1970s, he was an important figure in the Asian drug trade, particularly in the trafficking of "China white" heroin. In August 1973, he was arrested in Thailand and handed over to Myanmar. He was sentenced to death for treason on the grounds of his brief association with the insurgent Shan State Army (SSA). He was released in the 1980 during a General Amnesty.

Comeback
When the Kokang and Wa insurgent troops mutinied and toppled the Communist leadership in 1989, military intelligence chief Khin Nyunt found in Lo a useful intermediary in quickly arranging cease-fire agreements and, in return, Lo was given lucrative business opportunities and unofficial permission to run drugs with impunity along with the mutineers. He wasted no time in rebuilding the drug empire he lost 15 years ago to Khun Sa, a rival KKY chief of Loi Maw. No fewer than 17 new heroin refineries were located within a year in Kokang State and adjacent areas.

Business career
In June 1992, he founded the Asia World Company, allegedly as a front for his drug operations. His son, Steven Law (aka Tun Myint Naing), married to Cecilia Ng of Singapore in 1996, runs the company which won many multimillion-dollar contracts in the construction and energy sectors. In the wake of Cyclone Nargis, in February 2008, the US government included Lo, his son, and daughter-in-law, along with the 10 companies they control in Singapore, in its targeted sanctions list of the military junta's business cronies.

According to a report in The Observer, he helped organize and finance the opulent 2006 wedding of the daughter of the Myanmar dictator Than Shwe. A video was leaked onto the internet, showing a well-fed Thandar Shwe, perspiring under the weight of diamond-encrusted necklaces and hairbands and swathed in yards of silk as plump junta members sat on gold-trimmed chairs in front of a five-tiered wedding cake and champagne.

Asia World Company is involved in a number of big projects such as a Sino-Myanmar oil and gas pipeline project, a deep sea port at Kyaukpyu, the controversial Myitsone hydro-power plant and the Tasang hydro-power plant. Companies of the Chinese government have investments in all of them. Steven Law accompanied Thein Sein during his first official foreign visit to China after inauguration as a civilian president.

Death
Lo, heroin king and business tycoon, died on 6 July 2013, in Yangon, Myanmar. He was 80  and is survived by his wife, four sons, four daughters and 16 grandchildren, leaving them behind with a vast sum of wealth. In the secretive world of Myanmar's elite, the extent of Lo's wealth is not known. In an interview, a man often described as the richest person in Myanmar, U Tay Za, said the Lo family surpassed him in wealth.

Lo and his son, Steven Law, were two of the military's most important business partners and were awarded contracts to build roads, provincial seaports and other large infrastructure projects.

Notes

References

"Singapore's hand in Golden Triangle" by Michael McKenna at Singapore-window.org, November 23, 2005

External links
 Public Works and Asia World Co Ltd sign agreement to construct Kyukok-Muse-Nanhkam road New Light of Myanmar, 7 May 2000

1935 births
2013 deaths
Burmese businesspeople
Burmese people of Chinese descent
Burmese prisoners sentenced to death
People convicted of treason
People from Shan State
Prisoners sentenced to death by Myanmar